Perkins Tank is located south of Williams in North Central Arizona within the acreage of Kaibab National Forest.

Fish species & information
 Rainbow trout

References

External links
 Arizona Boating Locations Facilities Map
 Arizona Fishing Locations Map
 Video of Perkins Tank

Lakes of Arizona
Lakes of Coconino County, Arizona
Kaibab National Forest